Sharon Center is an unincorporated community in Johnson County, Iowa, United States.

History
Founded in the 1800s, Sharon Center's population was 27 in 1902.

References

Unincorporated communities in Johnson County, Iowa
Unincorporated communities in Iowa